Tvoja tvár znie povedome is a Slovak reality television series that is aired on Markíza. It is both based on the Endemol format Your Face Sounds Familiar and an adaptation of the Spanish "Tu cara me suena." The show was first broadcast on March 6, 2016 and is still aired. The show involves eight celebrities (singers, actors and television personalities) portraying various iconic singers each week to win 1,000 EUR for their chosen charity.

Format
The show challenges celebrities to perform as different iconic music artists every week, which are chosen by the show's "Randomiser". They are then judged by the panel of celebrity judges.

Each celebrity becomes transformed into a different singer each week, and performs an iconic song and dance routine well known by that particular singer. The 'randomiser' can choose any older or younger artist available in the machine, or even a singer of the opposite sex, or a deceased singer. Celebrity is transformed to look like well know singer, use of blackface is not rarity to this day.

The contestants are awarded points from the judges based on their singing and dance routines. After the jury vote, the contestants have to give a set of points to a fellow contestant of their choice. The total score of each contestant is counted by summing the points from judges and contestant's voting. In case of a tie, the judges will choose the weeks winner.

Whoever is at the top of the leaderboard at the end of the each show receives a cash prize for a charity of their choice and a further grand prize for the "series champion".

Voting
The contestants are awarded points from the judges (and each other) based on their singing and dance routines. The points go from 1 to 8, with 8 being the judge's favorite of the night. After that, each contestant gives 5 points to a fellow contestant of their choice (known as "Bonus" points). The judges' score is combined with the "Bonus" points.

Cast

Presenter
Martin Pyco Rausch as presenter on every episode. In Season 5, Martin Pyco Rausch was replaced with Martin Nikodým.

Judges
Daniel Dangl, Zuzana Fialová and Mário Kuly Kollár as judges on every episode, while the fourth judge varies with each episode. In Season 3, was added to the judges Juraj Šoko Tabaček. In Season 4, Juraj Šoko Tabaček was replaced with Andrej Bičan. In Season 5, Andrej Bičan was replaced with Zuzana Kubovčíková Šebová. In Season 6, Zuzana Fialová and Daniel Dangl were replaced with Lujza Garajová-Schrameková. In Season 2, Daniel Dangl was replaced in the eighth episode with Tina. In Season 4, Daniel Dangl was replaced in the fifth episode with Helena Vondráčková. In Season 6, Zuzana Kubovčíková Šebová was replaced in the ninth episode with Zuzana Fialová and in the final episode was replaced with Adéla Vinczeová.

Key
 Judge
 Presenter
 Contestant

Coaches
In Season 2, Jana Daňová-Bugalová was replaced with Barbora Švidraňová, in Season 3 Jana Daňová-Bugalová returned. In Season 6, Zuzana Fialová was replaced with Peter Brajerčík.

Key
 Vocal
 Dance
 Drama
 Contestant

Series overview

Season 1 (2016)
The first season premiered on March 6, 2016. The contestants were four women and four men:

 Barbora Švidraňová, Michaela Čobejová, Helena Krajčiová, Emma Drobná
 Lukáš Adamec, Štefan Skrúcaný, Andrej Bičan, Viktor Vincze

Season 2 (2016)
The second season premiered on September 4, 2016. The contestants were four women and four men:

 Miroslava Partlová, Mária Čírová, Lenka Vavrinčíková, Zuzana Vačková
 Martin Harich, Svatopluk Malachovský, Patrik Vyskočil, Andrej Bičan

Season 3 (2017)
The third season premiered on March 5, 2017. The contestants were four women and four men:

 Lina Mayer, Eva Máziková, Viktória Valúchová, Lucia Siposová
 Tomáš Palonder, Peter Brajerčík, René Štúr, Tomáš Bezdeda

Season 4 (2018)
The fourth season premiered on September 9, 2018. The contestants were four women and four men:

 Jasmina Alagič, Mária Bartalos, Zuzana Haasová, Ivana Regešová
 Dárius Koči, Juraj Loj, Martin Nikodým, Miroslav Šmajda

Season 5 (2019)
The fifth season premiered on September 8, 2019. The contestants were four women and four men:

 Zuzana Kraváriková, Nela Pocisková, Karin Haydu, Alexandra Gachulincová
 Noël Czuczor, Dávid Hartl, Pavol Topoľský, Rastislav Sokol

Season 6 (2021)
The sixth season premiered on March 7, 2021. The contestants were four women and four men:

 Barbora Piešová, Evelyn, Zuzana Belohorcová, Kristína Madarová
 Fero Joke, Dušan Cinkota, Martin Klinčúch, Braňo Mosný

Season 7 (2022)
The seventh season premiered on September 4, 2022. The contestants were four women and four men:

 Liv Belovič, Simona Salátová, Viki Ráková, Natália Puklušová
 Matúš Kolárovský, Ondrej Kandráč, Adam Pavlovčin, Karol Tóth

Season 1
This season was announced in the year 2016 and started on March 6, 2016. In this Season, Martin Pyco Rausch was the presenter. The Judges were Daniel Dangl, Zuzana Fialová, Mário Kuly Kollár and the special guest. Zuzana Fialová was the drama coach. Jana Daňová-Bugalová was the vocal coach. Miňo Kereš was the choreographer. The winner of the First Season was Lukáš Adamec.

Contestants

Performances

Color key:
 indicates the contestant came first that week
 indicates the contestant came last that week
 indicates the contestant did not score
 indicates the contestant was eliminated

Results summary

Special Performances

Invite a Friend

Season overview

Season 2
This season was announced in the year 2016 and started on September 4, 2016. In this Season, Martin Pyco Rausch was the presenter. The Judges were Daniel Dangl, Zuzana Fialová, Mário Kuly Kollár and the special guest. Zuzana Fialová was the drama coach. Barbora Švidraňová was the vocal coach. Miňo Kereš was the choreographer. The winner of the Second Season was Mária Čírová.

Contestants

Performances

Color key:
 indicates the contestant came first that week
 indicates the contestant came last that week
 indicates the contestant did not score
 indicates the contestant was eliminated

Results summary

Special Performances

Invite a Friend

Season overview

Season 3
This season was announced in the year 2017 and started on March 5, 2017. In this Season, Martin Pyco Rausch was the presenter. The Judges were Daniel Dangl, Zuzana Fialová, Mário Kuly Kollár and Juraj Šoko Tabáček. Zuzana Fialová was the drama coach. Jana Daňová-Bugalová was the vocal coach. Miňo Kereš was the choreographer. The winner of the Third Season was Peter Brajerčík.

Contestants

Performances

Color key:
 indicates the contestant came first that week
 indicates the contestant came last that week
 indicates the contestant did not score
 indicates the contestant was eliminated

Results summary

Special Performances

Invite a Friend

Season overview

Season 4
This season was announced in the year 2018 and started on September 9, 2018. In this Season, Martin Pyco Rausch was the presenter. The Judges were Daniel Dangl, Zuzana Fialová, Mário Kuly Kollár and Andrej Bičan. Zuzana Fialová was the drama coach. Jana Daňová-Bugalová was the vocal coach. Miňo Kereš was the choreographer. The winner of the Fourth Season was Dárius Koči.

Contestants

Performances

Color key:
 indicates the contestant came first that week
 indicates the contestant came last that week
 indicates the contestant did not score
 indicates the contestant was eliminated

Results summary

Special Performances

Invite a Friend

Season overview

Season 5
This season was announced in the year 2019 and started on September 8, 2019. In this Season, Martin Nikodým was the presenter. The Judges were Daniel Dangl, Zuzana Fialová, Mário Kuly Kollár and Zuzana Kubovčíková Šebová. Zuzana Fialová was the drama coach. Jana Daňová-Bugalová was the vocal coach. Miňo Kereš was the choreographer. The winner of the Fifth Season was Dávid Hartl.

Contestants

Performances

Color key:
 indicates the contestant came first that week
 indicates the contestant came last that week
 indicates the contestant did not score
 indicates the contestant was eliminated

Results summary

Special Performances

Invite a Friend

Season overview

Season 6 
This season was announced on Spring 2021 and started on March 7, 2021. In this Season, Martin Nikodým was the presenter. The Judges were Mário Kuly Kollár, Zuzana Kubovčíková Šebová, Lujza Garajová Schrameková and the special guest. Peter Brajerčík was the drama coach. Jana Daňová-Bugalová was the vocal coach. Miňo Kereš was the choreographer. The winner of the Sixth Season was Martin Klinčúch.

Contestants

Performances 

Color key:
 indicates the contestant came first that week
 indicates the contestant came last that week
 indicates the contestant did not score
 indicates the contestant was eliminated
(The Duel) indicates the contestant won The Duel
(The Duel) indicates the contestant lost The Duel

Results summary

Special Performances

Invite a Friend

Season overview

Season 7 
This season was announced in Fall 2022 and started on September 4, 2022. In this Season, Martin Nikodým was the presenter. The Judges were Mário Kuly Kollár, Zuzana Kubovčíková Šebová, Marián Čekovský and Attila Végh. Peter Brajerčík was the drama coach. Jana Daňová-Bugalová was the vocal coach. Miňo Kereš was the choreographer. This season was special ninth Czechoslovak week. The winner of the Seventh Season was Viki Ráková.

Contestants

Performances 

Color key:
 indicates the contestant came first that week
 indicates the contestant came last that week
 indicates the contestant did not score
 indicates the contestant was eliminated

Results summary

Special Performances

Invite a Friend

Season overview

Viewing figures

References

External links
Tvoja tvár znie povedome

Your Face Sounds Familiar
2016 Slovak television seasons
Markíza original programming